The former Zanesville YWCA, located at 49 North 6th Street in Zanesville, Ohio, United States, is an historic building built in 1926 for members of the Young Women's Christian Association.  It was designed by Howell & Thomas. On July 17, 1978, it was added to the National Register of Historic Places. It is now Bryan Place.

History and current use
The building was built in 1926 for members of the YWCA. Like many YWs of the time, the Zanesville YW provided rooms for single women to rent in addition to providing recreational and social activities for young women. The Zanesville YW closed in 1993 and the building is now Bryan Place.

See also
 National Register of Historic Places listings in Muskingum County, Ohio

References

External links

 Bryan Place website

National Register of Historic Places in Muskingum County, Ohio
Clubhouses on the National Register of Historic Places in Ohio
Buildings and structures in Zanesville, Ohio
Buildings and structures completed in 1926
YWCA buildings
1926 establishments in Ohio
History of women in Ohio